Deoxyribonuclease 2 beta is a protein that in humans is encoded by the DNASE2B gene.

Function

The protein encoded by this gene shares considerable sequence similarity to, and is structurally related to DNase II. The latter is a well characterized endonuclease that catalyzes DNA hydrolysis in the absence of divalent cations at acidic pH. Unlike DNase II which is ubiquitously expressed, expression of this gene product is restricted to the salivary gland and lungs. The gene has been localized to chromosome 1p22.3 adjacent (and in opposite orientation) to the uricase pseudogene. Two transcript variants encoding different isoforms have been described for this gene. [provided by RefSeq, Jul 2008].

References

Further reading